Freia may refer to:

 Freyja, a Norse goddess
 76 Freia, a main belt asteroid
 Freia (chocolate), a Norwegian chocolate brand

See also 

 Freja (disambiguation)
 Freya (disambiguation)
 Freyja (disambiguation)